Communauté d'agglomération de Cambrai is the communauté d'agglomération, an intercommunal structure, centred on the city of Cambrai. It is located in the Nord department, in the Hauts-de-France region, northern France. Created in 2017, its seat is in Cambrai. Its area is 411.3 km2. Its population was 81,335 in 2019, of which 32,176 in Cambrai proper.

Composition
The communauté d'agglomération consists of the following 55 communes:

Abancourt
Anneux
Aubencheul-au-Bac
Awoingt
Banteux
Bantigny
Bantouzelle
Blécourt
Boursies
Cagnoncles
Cambrai
Cantaing-sur-Escaut
Cauroir
Crèvecœur-sur-l'Escaut
Cuvillers
Doignies
Escaudœuvres
Esnes
Estrun
Eswars
Flesquières
Fontaine-Notre-Dame
Fressies
Gonnelieu
Gouzeaucourt
Haynecourt
Hem-Lenglet
Honnecourt-sur-Escaut
Iwuy
Lesdain
Marcoing
Masnières
Mœuvres
Naves
Neuville-Saint-Rémy
Niergnies
Noyelles-sur-Escaut
Paillencourt
Proville
Raillencourt-Sainte-Olle
Ramillies
Ribécourt-la-Tour
Rieux-en-Cambrésis
Les Rues-des-Vignes
Rumilly-en-Cambrésis
Sailly-lez-Cambrai
Sancourt
Séranvillers-Forenville
Thun-l'Évêque
Thun-Saint-Martin
Tilloy-lez-Cambrai
Villers-en-Cauchies
Villers-Guislain
Villers-Plouich
Wambaix

References

Cambrai
Cambrai